8th Regiment of Horse or 8th Horse may refer to:

 Carabiniers (6th Dragoon Guards), ranked as 8th Horse from 1685 to 1694
 7th Dragoon Guards, ranked as 8th Horse from 1694 to 1746